The Isotta Fraschini V.4 of 1916 was an Italian six-cylinder, water-cooled, in-line piston aero engine of World War I (the "V" denoted "Volo" or "flight").  Its construction was fairly typical of aircraft engines of the period with six cast-iron cylinders mounted in pairs with common heads. This engine was also produced by Alfa Romeo.

Applications
 CANT 7
 Caproni Ca.3
 Caproni Ca.30
 Caproni Ca.33
 Caproni Ca.34
 Caproni Ca.35
 Caproni Ca.36
 FBA Type H
 Macchi L.1
 Macchi M.5
 Macchi M.6
 Macchi M.8
 SIAI S.8

Variants
V.4
V.4A
V.4B
V.4Bb

Engines on display
 A V.4b is on display in the Gianni Caproni Museum of Aeronautics
 The Caproni Ca.36 on display in the National Museum of the United States Air Force is fitted with a V.4b engine.

Specifications (V.4b)

See also

References

Notes

Bibliography

Gunston, Bill. World Encyclopedia of Aero Engines. Cambridge, England. Patrick Stephens Limited, 1989. 

V.4
1910s aircraft piston engines